Princess Emma of Anhalt-Bernburg-Schaumburg-Hoym (20 May 1802–1 August 1858) was a German princess. She was grandmother of Queen Emma of the Netherlands, who was born the day after she died and was named after her, and was great-grandmother of Queen regnant Wilhelmina of the Netherlands.

Life 
Emma was one of the four daughters of the prince Victor II, Prince of Anhalt-Bernburg-Schaumburg-Hoym (1767–1812) from his marriage to Amelia of Nassau-Weilburg (1776–1841), daughter of Charles Christian, Prince of Nassau-Weilburg.  She grew up together with her sisters in Hoym in Anhalt and was carefully educated.  Their great-uncle, Frederick, Prince of Anhalt-Bernburg-Schaumburg-Hoym, had waived his right of succession in Schaumburg and the County of Holzappel in 1811 in favour of his great-niece, but in 1828 this decision was overruled.

After her husband's death in 1852, she ruled Waldeck and Pyrmont as Regent for her minor son George Victor.  Among her first acts was a reform of the Waldeck contingent of the federal army, implemented in 1845 by Prussian officers.  The Revolutions of 1848 took place during Emma's reign; in Waldeck they led to a new parliament being convened.  Emma's reign has been described as an important phase in the history of Waldeck, with a complete overhaul of the organisation of the state.

The Emma Waterfall in the Gastein Valley was named after her, as was her granddaughter, the Dutch Queen regent Emma.  A double thaler issued in 1847 was known as Fat Emma.

Marriage and issue 
She married on 26 June 1823 at Schaumburg Castle, George II, Prince of Waldeck and Pyrmont (1789–1845). The couple had five children:

 Princess Augusta of Waldeck-Pyrmont (1824–1893), married Count Alfred of Stolberg-Stolberg
 Joseph (1825–1829)
 Princess Hermine of Waldeck and Pyrmont (1827–1910), married Prince Adolf I George of Schaumburg-Lippe
 George Victor (1831–1893), married Princess Helena of Nassau and secondly Princess Louise of Schleswig-Holstein-Sonderburg-Glücksburg; he was the father of the Dutch Queen regent Emma, and hence the grandfather of the Queen regnant Wilhelmina of the Netherlands.
 Walrad (1833–1867)

Ancestry and descent

Ancestry

References 
 Das Fürstenthum Waldeck-Pyrmont seit 1848, in: Unsere Zeit, F. A. Brockhaus, Leipzig 1862, p. 681 ff Online
 A. Rauch, Parlamentarisches Taschenbuch enthaltend die Verfassung ..., Erlangen, 1849,

External links 
 WOMEN IN POWER 1840-1870: 1845-52 Regent Dowager Princess Emma von Anhalt-Bernburg-Schaumburg-Hoym of Waldeck-Pyrmont. In: Worldwide Guide to Women in Leadership.

Footnotes 

|-

House of Ascania
Princesses of Waldeck and Pyrmont
1802 births
1858 deaths
19th-century German people
House of Nassau
Daughters of monarchs